Wilentz may refer to:

People
 Amy Wilentz, American author
 Sean Wilentz (b. 1951), Sidney and Ruth Lapidus Professor of History at Princeton University
 Robert Wilentz (1927–1996), Chief Justice of the New Jersey Supreme Court from 1979 to 1996
 David T. Wilentz (1894–1988), Attorney General of New Jersey from 1934 to 1944
 Warren W. Wilentz (1924-2010) an American lawyer and Democratic politician from New Jersey

Companies